Eupterote obsoleta is a moth in the family Eupterotidae. It was described by George Talbot in 1926. It is found on Borneo. The habitat consists of lowland limestone forests.

Adults are reddish brown.

References

Moths described in 1926
Eupterotinae